Doctors Association of Bangladesh is a trade association of doctors in Bangladesh. It is politically aligned with the right-wing Bangladesh Nationalist Party. It is a rival of the Awami League backed doctors association, Swadhinata Chikitshak Parishad.

History 
Doctors Association of Bangladesh was established in 1993 as the pro-Bangladesh Nationalist Party association of doctors. Swadhinata Chikitshak Parishad was formed in December 1993 as a Pro-Awami League association of doctors in response to the creation of the Doctors Association of Bangladesh.

Professor M. A. Hadi former President of the Doctors Association of Bangladesh died in 2007.

In May 2008, Judge Tanzina Ismail of Dhaka Special Court-6 sentenced the General Secretary of the Doctors Association of Bangladesh, AZM Zahid Hossain, was sentenced to 13 years imprisonment and his wife, Rifat Hossain, to three years imprisonment on corruption charges. In November the association opposed the caretaker governments appointment of administration officers of Bangabandhu Sheikh Mujib Medical University.

The association condemned the sacking of 11 doctors, including Sayeba Akhter, from Bangabandhu Sheikh Mujib Medical University on the reason that they were appointed for political reasons in September 2009.

In 2012, the association lost the Bangladesh Medical Association election to Swadhinata Chikitshak Parishad.

On 28 June 2015, former Prime Minister Khaleda Zia accused the Awami League government of politicization of the judiciary at an Iftar event of Doctors Association of Bangladesh.

In October 2016, Dr Kazi Mazharul Islam Dolon, a leader of the association, was arrested by Bangladesh Police.

The association established a medical camp for Rohingya refugees in Bangladesh where former Prime Minister Khaleda Zia distributed aid among the refugees in October 2017.

President of the Chittagong unit of Doctors Association of Bangladesh, Dr Khurshid Jamil Chowdhury, called on doctors to protest following the arrest of staff at Max Hospital over the alleged medical neglect leading to the death of a three year old in 2018. After Bangladesh Nationalist Party lost the 11th parliamentary election it started re-organizing Doctors Association of Bangladesh, Jatiyatabadi Matsyajibi Dal, and Agriculturists Association of Bangladesh. In June 2020, the Doctors Association of Bangladesh called for the government to provide more COVID-19 tests and protective equipment during the COVID-19 pandemic in Bangladesh. According to the association more than 200 doctors had been infected with COVID-19.

In December 2021, the association called on the government to send former Prime Minister Khaleda Zia, who was being treated at Evercare Hospital, abroad for medical treatment. The association observes the death anniversary of Shamsul Alam Khan Milon, who was killed for protesting against military dictator Hussain Mohammad Ershad, as Dr Milon Day.

References 

1993 establishments in Bangladesh
Organisations based in Dhaka
Professional associations based in Bangladesh
Trade associations based in Bangladesh
Bangladesh Nationalist Party